Buckingham Courthouse Historic District is a historic county courthouse complex and national historic district located at Buckingham, Buckingham County, Virginia. It encompasses 10 contributing buildings and 1 contributing object.  The courthouse building was built in 1873, and is a two-story temple-form Greek Revival style building fronted by a pedimented tetrastyle Doric order portico. It replaced an earlier courthouse designed by Thomas Jefferson and built between 1822 and 1824, but burned down in 1869. Also included in the district is the former Buckingham Tavern, former Buckingham Inn, the Leach House, the Presbyterian manse, the Masonic Hall, a brick house called West View, the Trinity Presbyterian Church (c. 1830), and Confederate monument.

It was listed on the National Register of Historic Places in 1969.

References

County courthouses in Virginia
Government buildings on the National Register of Historic Places in Virginia
Historic districts on the National Register of Historic Places in Virginia
Government buildings completed in 1873
Buildings and structures in Buckingham County, Virginia
National Register of Historic Places in Buckingham County, Virginia
Courthouses on the National Register of Historic Places in Virginia